In graph theory, Edmonds' algorithm or Chu–Liu/Edmonds' algorithm is an algorithm for finding a spanning arborescence of minimum weight (sometimes called an optimum branching).
It is the directed analog of the minimum spanning tree problem.
The algorithm was proposed independently first by Yoeng-Jin Chu and Tseng-Hong Liu (1965) and then by Jack Edmonds (1967).

Algorithm

Description

The algorithm has a recursive description.
We may also replace any set of parallel edges (edges between the same pair of vertices in the same direction) by a single edge with weight equal to the minimum of the weights of these parallel edges.

If the set of edges  does not contain any cycles, then .

Otherwise,  contains at least one cycle.
Arbitrarily choose one of these cycles and call it .
We now define a new weighted directed graph  in which the cycle  is "contracted" into one node as follows:

Since  is a spanning arborescence, each vertex has exactly one incoming edge.
Now we define  to be the set of marked edges, which form a minimum spanning arborescence.

Finding  for a single-vertex graph is trivial (it is just  itself), so the recursive algorithm is guaranteed to terminate.

Running time
This is as fast as Prim's algorithm for an undirected minimum spanning tree. In 1986, Gabow, Galil, Spencer, and Tarjan produced a faster implementation, with running time .

References

External links 
Edmonds's algorithm ( edmonds-alg ) – An implementation of Edmonds's algorithm written in C++ and licensed under the MIT License. This source is using Tarjan's implementation for the dense graph.
NetworkX, a python library distributed under BSD, has an implementation of Edmonds' Algorithm.

Graph algorithms